= Andrea Raya Rey =

Argentinian ecologist and biologist

- Born: Buenos Aires, Argentina
- Education: University of Buenos Aires
- Known for: Seabird Colonies, Ecology, Conservation

Andrea Raya Rey is an Argentinian ecologist and researcher, best known for her work on seabirds. Her research focuses on breeding biology, foraging ecology, conservation, and human impact in Argentina, Patagonia, and Sub-Antarctic Islands. She has been studying and aiding in seabird conservation efforts for over 20 years.

== Early life and education ==
From a very young age, Raya Rey was fascinated by the sea. During her undergraduate research, she studied dolphins in Southern Argentina. It was through this research that she was introduced to penguins. Rey earned her bachelor's degree and PhD in biology from the University of Buenos Aires.

== Career and impact ==
Raya Rey is a scientific researcher at the Centro Austral de Investigaciones Científicas (CADIC) (part of CONICET, Consejo Nacional de Investigaciones Científicas y Técnicas) in Ushuaia, Argentina (2000–present). Presently, most of Raya Rey's research takes place near Tierra Del Fuego, where she and her team study seven remote penguin colonies, mostly magellanic, crested, and gentoo penguins. Her research focuses on how human impact affects the colonies. Some specific examples include how changes in sea temperature impact penguin's and their prey and how ocean pollution is reaching remote penguin colonies. Raya Reycollects samples and uses GPS technology to better understand how penguin behaviors, such as foraging and reproduction habits, may change or adapt to factors like rising temperatures. She analyzes these behaviors to determine the health of the colonies and broader implications to the marine environment.

One major finding by Raya Rey and others is that there are three species of rockhopper penguins, a type of crested penguin. Rey and her team made this discovery using genetic testing and analysis. Crested penguin populations are very vulnerable to climate change. The assessment of these populations as distinct species may help create better conservation guidelines to protect them. Dr. Andrea Raya Rey, as well as other researchers, are now able to use drones to help monitor the populations of rockhoppers, and many other species of penguins around Tierra del Fuego. The use of this technology allows researchers to get close and learn about the daily life habits of the penguin populations without disturbing them. Being able to see how climate change, pollution, and other human impacts effect these penguins every day is an important factor for conservation efforts.

When tourism to Tierra del Fuego began increasing in 2005, Raya Reyfounded the group Comprosimo Onashaga. The goal of this group is to protect wildlife in and around the Beagle Channel by working with tourism companies and monitoring their actions to ensure they are not endangering local fauna. She is a member of the Penguin Watch team, a research group focused on understanding threats to penguin colonies on Isla de los Estados.

== Awards and recognition ==
Raya Rey was recognized by NASA in 2016 for her work on the relationship between seabirds and fisheries near Fairbanks, Alaska and for her drive to connect globally with other researchers, so they may all broaden the impact of their work.

== Media appearances ==
Raya Rey also appears in episode four, "The Far South" of the nature documentary series "Patagonia: Life on the Edge of the World", narrated by Pedro Pascal.

== Selected works ==
- Raya Rey, Andrea & Balza, Ulises. (2026). Correction to: Biodiversity and Conservation of Isla de los Estados (Chuani-sin). 10.1007/978-3-032-13630-5_16.
- Raya Rey, Andrea Nélida; Saenz Samaniego, Ricardo Andres; Petracci, Pablo Fabricio; New records of South American sea lion Otaria flavescens predation on southern rockhopper penguins Eudyptes chrysocome at Staten Island, Argentina; Springer; Polar Biology; 35; 2; 2–2012; 319–322
- Santaniello, Camille & Dodino, Samanta & Pütz, Klemens & Raya Rey, Andrea. (2025). Comprehensive stressor analysis for breeding Magellanic and Southern Rockhopper Penguins. Journal for Nature Conservation. 89. 127152. 10.1016/j.jnc.2025.127152.
- Raya Rey, Andrea & Balza, Ulises & Domato, Ignacio & Zunino, Francisco. (2022). New Magellanic penguin Spheniscus magellanicus colony in a subantarctic island. Polar Biology. 45. 1–6. 10.1007/s00300-022-03093-6.
